Marie-Hélène Chisholm (born January 8, 1979 in Port-Cartier, Quebec) is a Canadian judoka. She won a gold medal at the 2002 A Tournament in Sofia, Bulgaria in the 70 kg category.

See also
Judo in Quebec
Judo in Canada
List of Canadian judoka

External links
Marie-Hélène Chisholm on Real Champions

1979 births
Living people
Olympic judoka of Canada
Judoka at the 2004 Summer Olympics
Canadian female judoka
Sportspeople from Quebec
People from Côte-Nord